Sexual Medicine Reviews is an open access peer-reviewed journal of the medicine of sexuality. It is abstracted and indexed by Scopus.

References 

Sexology journals
Elsevier academic journals
Open access journals